Buzimba was a kingdom in what is today Uganda. It was incorporated into the British Ankole protectorate in 1901. It was ruled by an Omukama.

References
The Ankole Agreement, 1901

History of Uganda